The 1997 Nations Cup was the second event of six in the 1997–98
ISU Champions Series, a senior-level international invitational competition series. It was held in Gelsenkirchen on October 30 – November 2. Medals were awarded in the disciplines of men's singles, ladies' singles, pair skating, and ice dancing. Skaters earned points toward qualifying for the 1997–98 Champions Series Final.

Results

Men

Ladies

Pairs

Ice dancing

External links
 1997 Nations Cup

Nations Cup, 1997
Bofrost Cup on Ice